Blue Spur is a locality in Otago, New Zealand.

Description
Blue Spur is the area of the historic Otago Gold Rush town and gold mining fields north of the town of Lawrence in the Clutha District.

Name
The etymology of the term "blue spur" not well known. The gold diggers of the 1860s gold rush went after the gold "on the spur (of the moment)", i.e. in a great hurry/rush. Alluvial gold may often be found close to a layer of blueish clay. Miners frequently talk about mining down to the "blue clay", thus a "blue spur" could somehow elucidate the hasty process of digging for the gold pursuing a blueish layer of clay. Other potential meanings could refer to a blueish colour of mountains ("blue mountains") as it can be spotted in certain light at distant mountains at this location, combined with the geological meaning of a spur, i.e., a secondary mountain ridge. Besides these gold rush-related connotations there is a "blue spur flower" (Plectranthus ciliatus), and the "blue spur" in coats of arms.

References

Mountains of Otago
Otago Gold Rush